Students Liberation Bloc is a Palestinian students organization. It is the students wing of the Palestine Liberation Front.

In 2008, the Bloc won two seats in the elections to the students council at Al-Quds University.

References 

Student wings of Palestinian political parties